The 1919 Illinois Fighting Illini football team was an American football team that represented the University of Illinois in the Big Ten Conference during the 1919 college football season. In their seventh season under head coach Robert Zuppke, the Fighting Illini compiled a 6–1 record (6–1 against Big Ten opponents) and outscored their opponents by a combined total of 91 to 48. 

There was no contemporaneous system in 1919 for determining a national champion. However, Illinois was retroactively named as the national champion for 1919 by the Billingsley Report and Boand System, and as a co-national champion by the College Football Researchers Association, Parke H. Davis, and Jeff Sagarin (using his alternate ELO-Chess methodology). 

Fullback William Kopp was the team captain. Three Illinois players received mention on the 1919 All-America college football team: end Dick Reichle (first-team choice by the Reno Evening Gazette); tackle Burt Ingwersen (second-team choice by Walter Camp); and guard Jack Depler (second-team choice by Camp). 

Seven Illini players were included on the 1919 All-Big Ten Conference football team: quarterback Robert H. Fletcher; halfback Laurie Walquist; fullback Jack Crangle; end Chuck Carney; tackle Burt Ingerwesen; and guards Jack Depler and Clarence Applegran.

Schedule

Roster 

Head Coach: Robert Zuppke (7th year at Illinois)

Awards and honors 
Dick Reichle, end
 First-team selection of Reno Evening Gazette, selected by "W.P. Hahn, football expert of national note who is now located in Reno", for the 1919 College Football All-America Team
Burt Ingwersen, tackle
 Second-team selection by Walter Camp for the 1919 All-America team
Jack Depler, guard
 Second-team selection by Walter Camp for the 1919 All-America team

References

Illinois
Illinois Fighting Illini football seasons
College football national champions
Big Ten Conference football champion seasons
Illinois Fighting Illini football